Sitala palmaria is a species of air-breathing land snail, terrestrial pulmonate gastropod mollusks in the family Helicarionidae.

Distribution 
This species occurs in India, and was described from Nandi Hills, India by malacologist William Henry Benson in 1864.

References 

Helicarionidae
Gastropods described in 1864
Taxa named by William Henry Benson